The Communist Party of Nepal (Unified Socialist), abbreviated as CPN (Unified Socialist) is a political party in Nepal led by former Prime Minister Madhav Kumar Nepal. As of March 2022, the party had voted in favour of Dahal government and is an important ally in the governing coalition.

Former Prime Minister Madhav Kumar Nepal is the chairman of the party and former Prime Minister Jhala Nath Khanal serves as the senior leader. The party was officially registered at the Election Commission, Nepal on 18 August 2021 while it received its certificate of registration on 25 August when the Election Commission verified its application with signature of more than twenty percent in both central committee and federal parliamentary party.

Ideology 
The party's ideology consists of Marxism–Leninism and support for a multi-party system. The party also favors socialist-oriented economy.

History

Formation 

The President of Nepal, on the recommendation of the council of ministers issued second amendment on political parties related act on 18 August 2021 relaxing the requirements to split parties with 20 percent or more members of the Parliamentary Party and the Central Committee of the political party.

This same amendment opened the way to formalize the splits caused due to the dispute between two factions of Janata Samajbadi Party, Nepal and CPN(UML) respectively. The CPN(UML) faction led by Madhav Kumar Nepal and Jhala Nath Khanal which had a long dispute with CPN(UML) chairman KP Sharma Oli had applied to register their party by the name ''CPN (Unified Socialist)'' with the Election Commission. However, the Election Commission requested him not to register under a preregistered name by including some adjectives.

At the time of the launch of the party, leaders claimed to have 31 members in the two national houses of parliament including 23 from House of Representatives  and 8 from National Assembly. A Central Committee with 95 members was announced as well. However, many politicians of the mother party CPN(UML) hadn't finalised their decision yet including party less leader Bam Dev Gautam. Madhav Kumar Nepal was announced to act as the coordinator of the party.

The decision of Nepal to form a new party was however met with some criticism from within his own faction. The second generation leaders close to him boycotted the decision except party secretary Jeevan Ram Shrestha and Ram Kumari Jhakri. Leaders including Ghanashyam Bhusal and Yogesh Bhattarai sided with KP Sharma Oli for party unity. This faction included leaders like Yubaraj Gyawali, Asta Laxmi Shakya, Bhim Rawal, Ghanashyam Bhusal, Gokarna Bista, Bhim Acharya, Yogesh Bhattarai and standing committee members including Surendra Pandey, Raghuji Panta and Amrit Bohora. They even attended the standing committee meeting of 8th Bhadra which called upon Nepal faction for party unity for a final time and instructed CPN (UML) to fulfill their 10 points demand. Howeven the 10 point demand was never followed. Later Bhim Rawal and Ghanashyam Bhusal were ditched and side lined from the party after 10th general convention of former party for not following party supremo Oli.

On the same day (8th Bhadra), Nepal arranged a meeting where he presented the party's doctrine and announced that People's Multiparty Democracy would be their guiding philosophy.

Party Authentication

Following the registration, the Election Commission had summoned CPN (Unified Socialist) on 9th Bhadra for authentication. As per the new provision the party had to present signatures 20% of either the central committee or the parliamentary party to authenticate the registration. The party was able to meet the threshold with 55 out of 205 members of the central committee and 9 out of 33 of the National Assembly and 24 out of 121 of House of Representatives.

Among these members, Pradeep Nepal, a central committee member who was earlier close to Oli, was present during signature session. The signature of Jhalanath Khanal who signed it from Delhi was counted although the Election Commission had rejected his previous request to accept such signatures as he had been in Delhi for his kidney transplant. However, the Election Commission rejected to accept the signatures of Som Prasad Pandey, Maya Gyawali, Tulsa Thapa and Sharada Devi Bhatta as they hadn't signed the earlier application for party registration. Letter a petition was filed at Supreme Court which allowed them to join the new party.

Organization development and first local election 
The party election just eight months after the party formation. In spit of a very short period of organization development, party caders got elected unopposed as chairperson of Kaike and Chharka Tangsong rural municipalities of Dolpa district which remained the highest won unopposed by any party. While the party went to election without alliance in Madhesh Province, the party won six local levels out of which four were from Rautahat, the home district of party chair Madhav Kumar Nepal. The party gave close contest to Nepali Congress. Here, the party won five municipalities and one rural municipality. The party won mayor of Pokhara Metropolitan city and Hetauda Sub-metropolitan city destroying red fort of CPN (UML). Although the party obtained support of alliance in numerous places, it was able to bag only twenty local levels signing that the party organization had still not developed as expected.

As a whole, the party won 20 heads, 24 deputy heads, 190 ward chairs and 753 ward members with a total of 986 seats throughout the country. The party went most successful in Madhesh Province where it bagged 6 heads, 5 deputy heads, 80 ward chairs and 310 ward members with a total of 401 seats and that too without any pre electoral alliance contributing to 40% of total national wins.

Organization and structure

Central organization

Secretariat
A twelve-member Secretariat (also known as High Command) of the party was created. It included:

 Chairperson: Madhav Kumar Nepal
 General secretary: Beduram Bhusal
 Members: Jhala Nath Khanal, Mukunda Neupane, Ram Chandra Jha, Rajendra Prasad Pandey, Pramesh Kumar Hamal, Ghanashyam Bhusal, Jayanti Rai, Prakash Jwala, Gangalal Tuladhar, Bijay Paudel and Jagannath Khatiwada

Standing Committee 
The 35 member Standing Committee of the Central Political Bureau has been formed.

Politburo 
A 71-member politburo has been formed after the formation of the standing committee and central committee.

Central Committee 
The central committee had a total of 301 members, formed on 24 September 2021.

Leadership 
The party has one chairperson, seven Deputy chairpersons, one General secretary, four Deputy general secretary and six Secretary. Altogether there are 18 party portfolio holders. Jhalanath Khanal is senior leader and Mukunda Neupane is the leader of the party and are kept at position two and three respectively. Similarly Pradip Nepal is kept at number four.

Chairperson 
 Madhav Kumar Nepal

Deputy chairperson 
 Rajendra Prasad Pandey
 Beduram Bhusal
 Pramesh Kumar Hamal
 Dhanendra Basnet
 Kedar Neupane
 Keshav Lal Shrestha
 Dharmanath Prasad Sah
 Jayanti Rai

General Secretary 
 Ghanashyam Bhusal

Deputy General Secretary 
 Prakash Jwala
 Gangalal Tuladhar
 Bijay Paudel
Jagannath Khatiwada

Secretary 
 Nagendra Chaudhary
 Bhagwat Biswasi
 Garima Shah
 Rajendra Kumar Rai
 Ram Kumari Jhakri
Jeevan Ram Shrestha

Provincial committees

Chief ministers

Electoral performance

General election

Provincial election

List of Members of Parliament

List of Rastriya Sabha members from CPN (Unified Socilaist)

List of Pratinidhi Sabha members from CPN (Unified Socilaist)

Sister organizations  
Following are the sister organizations of the party:
 Integrated Centre of Trade Unions, Nepal (एकीकृत ट्रेड युनियन महासंघ, नेपाल)
 Youth Association of Nepal (युवा संघ नेपाल)
 All Nepal National Free Students Union (अखिल नेपाल राष्ट्रिय स्वतन्त्र विद्यार्थी युनियन)
 All Nepal Women's Association (Socialist) (अखिल नेपाल महिला सङ्घ (समाजवादी))
 All Nepal Peasants Association (अखिल नेपाल किसान महासंघ)
 Nepal National Teachers Association (नेपाल राष्ट्रिय शिक्षक संघ)

See also 
 List of political parties in Nepal 
 2021 split in Communist Party of Nepal (Unified Marxist-Leninist)

References 

Political parties in Nepal
Communist parties in Nepal
Political parties established in 2021
2021 establishments in Nepal
Communist Party of Nepal (Unified Socialist)